Lowenstam is a German-language surname, which means "lion trunk". Alternative spellings include  Löwenstam, Löwenstamm, Loewenstam and Loewenstamm. The name may refer to:

Arthur Löwenstamm (1882–1965), rabbi and theologian from Germany
Aryeh Leib ben Saul Löwenstamm (1690–1755), Polish rabbi
Heinz A. Lowenstam (1912–1993), American scientist
Hirschel Löwenstam (1721–1800), British rabbi
Saul Lowenstam (1717–1790), Dutch rabbi

See also
Lowenstein

References

German-language surnames
Jewish surnames